Carsten Cullmann (born 5 March 1976) is a German football manager and former player who played most of his career as a defender for 1. FC Köln.

Career 
In his youth, Cullmann played for Sportvereinigung Porz 1919 e.V. till he joined 1. FC Köln 1996–97 at the age of 20.

After two years with the amateurs, he was given his Bundesliga debut during the 1998–99 season. After many years and 192 games for Cologne's first squad, he last functioned as a "stand by", playing for the second squad in the fourth league and for the first team, should they require his service.

Cullmann is the son of former German international and 1. FC Köln player Bernd Cullmann.

References

External links 
 

1976 births
Living people
Footballers from Cologne
German footballers
1. FC Köln players
1. FC Köln II players
Bundesliga players
2. Bundesliga players
Association football defenders